Pedduru is a village in Rowthulapudi Mandal, East Godavari district in the state of Andhra Pradesh in India.

Geography 

Demographics 
 India census, Pedduru had a population of 156, out of which 77 were male and 79 were female. Population of children below 6 years of age were 23. The literacy rate of the village is 25.56%.

References 

Villages in East Godavari district